Aïssata Touré Kane (18 August 1938 – 10 August 2019) was a Mauritanian politician who was the country's first female government minister. After holding leadership positions in the youth wing and women's section of the Mauritanian People's Party, she served in the cabinet of President Moktar Ould Daddah from 1975 to 1978. Her time as a minister ended when Daddah's government was overthrown by a military coup.

Early life
Kane was born into a Toucouleur (Halpulaar) family in Dar El Barka, a small town in Brakna Region. Her father, Mame N'diack, was a long-serving district chief. Educational opportunities in Mauritania were limited during Kane's childhood, especially for women. Despite several of her relatives objecting to Western education, she was sent to a French-language school in Saint-Louis, Senegal. She is believed to have been one of the first Mauritanian girls to attend a Western school. In 1959 and 1960, Kane attended the Free University of Belgium on a scholarship. She was unable to complete her degree due to family issues, and after returning to Mauritania settled in the capital Nouakchott.

Politics
In 1957, the final year of her secondary education, Kane formed a group for the promotion of girls' education, called the Comité pour la fréquentation scolaire féminine ("Committee for Female School Attendance"). Her efforts received criticism from both Mauritanian and Senegalese sources, but she defended the group on the grounds that women's education was justified by Islamic law. In 1961, Kane helped to found the Union Nationale des Femmes de Mauritanie (UNFM; "National Union of the Women of Mauritania"), Mauritania's first national women's organisation. She represented the UNFM at a 1962 meeting of the Conference des Femmes Africaines (CFA; "Conference of African Women"), a Pan-African women's group, and subsequently went to work for that organisation in Algeria, living in Algiers for several years. She was also involved with the Women's International Democratic Federation (WIDF), attending its 1968 conference in Helsinki, Finland.

One of the co-founders of the UNFM was Mariem Daddah, the wife of President Moktar Ould Daddah. The UNFM was eventually integrated into the Mauritanian People's Party (PPM; the country's sole legal political party at the time), and became known as the Mouvement National Féminin (MNF; "National Women's Movement"). Kane became a high-ranking MNF official, and was responsible for the publication of its magazine, Marienou. She was also elected to the executive council of the PPM's youth wing in 1966. Having gained a reputation as a "powerful public speaker and a gifted organiser", Kane was added to Daddah's cabinet in August 1975, becoming Minister for the Protection of the Family and Social Affairs. She was Mauritania's first female cabinet minister. However, Daddah's government was overthrown by a military coup in July 1978, and Kane was excluded from the new ministry. Another woman was not appointed to cabinet until 1987, under President Maaouya Ould Sid'Ahmed Taya.

Women's rights
Kane had developed a national reputation as an advocate for women's rights even before becoming a government minister. She led efforts to improve women's health and education in Mauritania, and when the country adopted a new legal code successfully lobbied the government to include a provision for marital rights. She also successfully lobbied for the introduction of a quota for female representation in the Mauritanian Parliament, which initially stood at 10 percent and has since been raised. During her time in cabinet, Kane introduced a program that aimed to reduce the rate polygamous marriage, but was unable to significant lower it. On the subject of female genital mutilation, which occurs at high rates in Mauritania, she called for "all those involved in carrying out the procedure" to face penalties, and for the government to work towards its total eradication. Kane received support from high-ranking government officials during her career, including President Daddah, but some of her more radical reforms met opposition from religious conservatives.

Death
She died on 10 August 2019, eight days before her 81st birthday.

See also
 List of the first female holders of political offices in Africa
 Women in Mauritania

References

External links
 2005 interview with Kane on the compatibility of Islam and women's rights 

1938 births
2019 deaths
Activists against female genital mutilation
Fula people
Government ministers of Mauritania
Mauritanian People's Party politicians
Mauritanian women's rights activists
People from Brakna Region
20th-century Mauritanian women politicians